Galway West is a parliamentary constituency represented in Dáil Éireann, the lower house of the Irish parliament or Oireachtas. The constituency elects 5 deputies (Teachtaí Dála, commonly known as TDs) on the system of proportional representation by means of the single transferable vote (PR-STV).

History and boundaries
The constituency was created under the Electoral (Revision of Constituencies) Act 1935 and first used at the 1937 general election, when the former Galway constituency was split into Galway East and Galway West.

It currently spans the western half of County Galway, taking in Galway city, the Galway Gaeltacht, and Clifden, as well as part of southern County Mayo.

The Electoral (Amendment) (Dáil Constituencies) Act 2017 defines the constituency as:

TDs

Elections

2020 general election

2020 Galway West opinion poll

2016 general election

2016 Galway West opinion poll

2011 general election

2007 general election

2002 general election

1997 general election

1992 general election

1989 general election

1987 general election

November 1982 general election

February 1982 general election

1981 general election

1977 general election

1975 by-election
Following the death of Fianna Fáil TD Johnny Geoghegan, a by-election was held on 4 March 1975. The seat was won by the Fianna Fáil candidate Máire Geoghegan-Quinn, daughter of the deceased TD.

1973 general election

1969 general election

1965 general election

1961 general election

1957 general election

1954 general election

1951 general election

1948 general election

1944 general election

1943 general election

1940 by-election
Following the death of Fianna Fáil TD Seán Tubridy, a by-election was held on 30 May 1940. The seat was won by the Fianna Fáil candidate John J. Keane.

1938 general election

1937 general election

See also
Elections in the Republic of Ireland
Politics of the Republic of Ireland
List of Dáil by-elections
List of political parties in the Republic of Ireland

References

External links
 Oireachtas Constituency Dashboards
 Oireachtas Members Database

Dáil constituencies
Politics of County Galway
Politics of Galway (city)
1937 establishments in Ireland
Constituencies established in 1937